Dirce (modern Greek , meaning "double" or "cleft") was a queen of Thebes as the wife of Lycus in Greek mythology.

Family 
Dirce was a daughter of the river-gods Achelous or Ismenus, or of Helios.

Mythology 

After Zeus impregnated Dirce's niece Antiope, the latter fled in shame to King Epopeus of Sicyon, but was brought back by Lycus through force, giving birth to the twins Amphion and Zethus on the way. Lycus gave Antiope to Dirce. Dirce hated Antiope and treated her cruelly, until Antiope, in time, escaped.

In Euripides' lost play Antiope, Antiope flees back to the cave where she gave birth to Amphion and Zethus; they are now living there as young men.  They disbelieve her claim to be their mother and refuse her pleas for sanctuary, but when Dirce comes to find Antiope and orders her to be killed, the twins are convinced by the shepherd who raised them that Antiope is their mother.  They kill Dirce by tying her to the horns of a bull.

Dirce was devoted to the god Dionysus. He caused a spring to flow where she died, either at Mount Cithaeron or at Thebes, and it was a local tradition for the outgoing Theban hipparch to swear in his successor at her tomb. In Statius' Thebaid, the spring is a symbol of Thebes, and its name is often used metonymically to refer to the city itself.

In Roman culture

The death of Dirce is depicted in a marble statue known as the Farnese Bull, which is now in the collections of the National Archaeological Museum in Naples. The colossal piece, a first-century-AD Roman copy of a second-century-BC Hellenistic Greek original, was first excavated in the 16th century in the Baths of Caracalla. Some scholars identify it with the statue group mentioned in Pliny's Natural History, but this is disputed.

This scene was recreated in spectacles in the Roman arena. Clement, in his First Letter to the Corinthians, recounts how Christian women were martyred.

Notes

References 
Apollodorus, The Library with an English Translation by Sir James George Frazer, F.B.A., F.R.S. in 2 Volumes, Cambridge, MA, Harvard University Press; London, William Heinemann Ltd. 1921. ISBN 0-674-99135-4. Online version at the Perseus Digital Library. Greek text available from the same website.
Callimachus, Callimachus and Lycophron with an English translation by A. W. Mair ; Aratus, with an English translation by G. R. Mair, London: W. Heinemann, New York: G. P. Putnam 1921. Internet Archive
Callimachus, Works. A.W. Mair. London: William Heinemann; New York: G.P. Putnam's Sons. 1921. Greek text available at the Perseus Digital Library.
Euripides, The Tragedies of Euripides translated by T. A. Buckley. Bacchae. London. Henry G. Bohn. 1850. Online version at the Perseus Digital Library.
Euripides, Euripidis Fabulae. vol. 3. Gilbert Murray. Oxford. Clarendon Press, Oxford. 1913. Greek text available at the Perseus Digital Library.
Euripides, Heracles, translated by E. P. Coleridge in The Complete Greek Drama, edited by Whitney J. Oates and Eugene O'Neill, Jr. Volume 1. New York. Random House. 1938. Online version at the Perseus Digital Library.
Euripides, Euripidis Fabulae. vol. 2. Gilbert Murray. Oxford. Clarendon Press, Oxford. 1913. Greek text available at the Perseus Digital Library.
Nonnus of Panopolis, Dionysiaca translated by William Henry Denham Rouse (1863-1950), from the Loeb Classical Library, Cambridge, MA, Harvard University Press, 1940.  Online version at the Topos Text Project.
Nonnus of Panopolis, Dionysiaca. 3 Vols. W.H.D. Rouse. Cambridge, MA., Harvard University Press; London, William Heinemann, Ltd. 1940–1942. Greek text available at the Perseus Digital Library.
Pausanias, Description of Greece with an English Translation by W.H.S. Jones, Litt.D., and H.A. Ormerod, M.A., in 4 Volumes. Cambridge, MA, Harvard University Press; London, William Heinemann Ltd. 1918. . Online version at the Perseus Digital Library
Pausanias, Graeciae Descriptio. 3 vols. Leipzig, Teubner. 1903.  Greek text available at the Perseus Digital Library.
Publius Papinius Statius, The Thebaid translated by John Henry Mozley. Loeb Classical Library Volumes. Cambridge, MA, Harvard University Press; London, William Heinemann Ltd. 1928. Online version at the Topos Text Project.
Publius Papinius Statius, The Thebaid. Vol I-II. John Henry Mozley. London: William Heinemann; New York: G.P. Putnam's Sons. 1928. Latin text available at the Perseus Digital Library.
Tripp, Edward. Crowell's Handbook of Classical Mythology. New York: Thomas Crowell Press, 1970.

External links
 Images of Dirce in the Warburg Institute Iconographic Database 

Children of Potamoi
Women in Greek mythology
Theban characters in Greek mythology
Children of Helios
Queens in Greek mythology
Metamorphoses into bodies of water in Greek mythology